Ziliak may refer to:

James Ziliak, American business economist
Stephen Ziliak, American business economist